Academy of St Francis of Assisi is a coeducational joint-faith Roman Catholic and Church of England secondary school with academy status. The school is located in the Fairfield area of Liverpool, England, and is named after Saint Francis of Assisi.

Description
The school first opened in 2005.

The Academy of St Francis of Assisi was built on the site of a waste dump at a cost of £20 million. The buildings are constructed to environmentally sustainable standards, with features including a solar atrium, a rainwater re-harvesting facility and a roof garden. The school is jointly sponsored by the Roman Catholic Archdiocese of Liverpool and  the Anglican Diocese of Liverpool.

The Academy of St Francis of Assisi offers GCSEs and BTECs as programmes of study for pupils, while students in the sixth form have the option to study from a range of A-levels and further BTECs. The school has a specialism in sustainable development and the environment.

References

External links
The Academy of St Francis of Assisi official website

Secondary schools in Liverpool
Catholic secondary schools in the Archdiocese of Liverpool
Church of England secondary schools in the Diocese of Liverpool
Academies in Liverpool